Lists of women in music cover different categories of women in music, including composers, conductors, groups, musicians and singers. They are organized by instrument, nationality, style and so on.

African-Americans 

 List of African-American women in classical music

Composers
List of female composers by name
List of female composers by birth date
List of Australian female composers

Conductors

List of female classical conductors

Groups
List of all-female bands
List of best-selling girl groups
List of girl groups
List of riot grrrl bands

Musicians
List of female bass guitarists
List of female drummers
List of female electronic musicians
List of female violinists
List of women classical cellists
List of women classical flautists
List of women classical guitarists
List of women classical pianists

Singers

List of AKB48 members
List of American female country singers
List of Bangladeshi female playback singers
List of BNK48 members
List of classic female blues singers
List of contraltos in non-classical music
List of female heavy metal singers
List of female Lebanese singers
List of female rock singers
List of former members of AKB48
List of Idol School contestants
List of Indian female playback singers
List of mezzo-sopranos in non-classical music
List of Morning Musume members
List of operatic contraltos
List of Produce 101 contestants
List of SNH48 members
List of sopranos in non-classical music
Members of JKT48
Seven Great Singing Stars

See also
:Category:Lists of female dancers
Lists of musicians
Lists of singers